The Lady Vanishes is a 2013 British television mystery thriller film directed by Diarmuid Lawrence, and a co-production of the BBC and Masterpiece Films. It is based on the 1936 novel The Wheel Spins by Ethel Lina White. It stars Selina Cadell in the role of the disappearing Miss Froy, Tuppence Middleton as the young Iris Carr (who discovers the disappearance but is not taken seriously), Tom Hughes and Alex Jennings as Max Hare and the Professor, the two fellow English passengers who come to her aid. It was watched by 7.44 million when it was broadcast on Sunday 17 March 2013 on BBC One.

Summary
The film is less a remake of Alfred Hitchcock's 1938 film of the same name than a new interpretation of the novel, one based far more closely on it. It depicts a young English socialite, Iris Carr, travelling by train across 1930s Europe, returning to England from Croatia. She is alarmed by the mysterious disappearance of an English governess, Miss Froy, also travelling on the train. She enlists the help (initially given somewhat reluctantly) of the handsome young Max Hare, and his former Oxford Professor, who are travelling together on the train, for reasons unstated. As in the book (but unlike the 1938 version of the film), Miss Froy is merely what she appears, and not a British agent of MI6. The motive for her kidnap is not her secret intelligence service operations, but the fact that she witnessed a suspected murderer under circumstances that would have invalidated his alibi for the murder.

Cast
 Tuppence Middleton as Iris Carr
 Tom Hughes as Max Hare
 Selina Cadell as Miss Froy
 Keeley Hawes as Laura Parmiter
 Julian Rhind-Tutt as Mr Todhunter
 Stephanie Cole as Evelyn Floodporter
 Gemma Jones as Rose Floodporter
 Sandy McDade as Mrs Barnes
 Pip Torrens as Reverend Kenneth Barnes
 Alex Jennings as the Professor
 Jesper Christensen as the Doctor
 Benedikte Hansen as the Baroness
 Emerald Fennell as Odette

Production
The setting of the remake is the luxury express passenger train from Croatia to Trieste, rather than in the original fictional country. An entire 1930s luxury passenger train interior, complete with sleeping carriages, a dining car, and a passenger bar and lounge car, were all recreated, to scale, in Budapest for the production of the film. Diarmuid Lawrence, the director, makes an appearance, just as Hitchcock did.

References

External links 

2013 crime thriller films
BBC television dramas
British crime thriller films
British mystery thriller films
Films based on British novels
Films based on mystery novels
Films based on thriller novels
Films set in the 1930s
Films set on trains
Films shot in Hungary
Remakes of British films
2013 television films
2013 films
2010s mystery thriller films
Spy television films
British thriller television films
2010s British films